Original Ai (stylized in caps) is the second studio album by Japanese–American singer-songwriter Ai. It was released on July 23, 2003 by Def Jam Japan and Universal Music Group. The album features guest appearances and collaborations from Dabo, American rapper Joe Budden and Sphere of Influence.

Four singles were released from Original Ai. The lead single "Last Words" became Ai's best performing single on the Oricon singles chart until her 2005 single "365".

Background 
Ai previously released her debut studio album, My Name Is Ai in 2001 under BMG Japan. Following its very little commercial success, Ai moved to Def Jam Japan and became the first woman signed to the label. Compared to her previous label, Ai stated she felt more at home with Def Jam Japan. Her first release under the label was the lead single "Last Words", which peaked at number 27 on the Japanese Oricon singles chart. The second single "Thank U" was released in June 2003, peaking at number 37 on the Oricon singles chart.

Track listing 
All tracks written by Ai Uemura unless noted.Notes

 Tracks 1, 9 and 13 are titled in Japanese.
 Track 13 translates in English as "Merry Christmas on the Battlefield" or "Battlefield Merry Christmas".
 Tracks 2, 5, 6, 10, and 12 are stylized in all capitals.

Charts

Release history

Notes

References

External links 

 

2003 albums
Ai (singer) albums
Universal Music Group albums
Def Jam Japan albums